William Henry Calkins (February 18, 1842 – January 29, 1894) was an American lawyer and  Civil War veteran who served four terms as a U.S. Representative from Indiana from 1881 to 1884.

Early career
Born in Pike County, Ohio, Calkins studied law.
He was admitted to the bar and practiced.
During the Civil War served in the Union Army from May 1861 to December 1865, except three months in 1863, attached to the Fourteenth Iowa Infantry and the Twelfth Indiana Cavalry. He was promoted to major on March 4, 1864 and served until November 10, 1865.
Took up his residence in La Porte, Indiana.
State's attorney for the ninth Indiana judicial circuit 1866-1870.
He served as member of the Indiana House of Representatives in 1871.

Congress 
Calkins was elected as a Republican to the Forty-fifth and to the three succeeding Congresses and served from March 4, 1877, to October 20, 1884, when he resigned.

Later career 
He served as chairman of the Committee on Elections (Forty-seventh Congress).
He moved to Tacoma, Washington, and resumed the practice of law.
He was appointed United States associate justice of the Territory of Washington in April 1889 and served until November 11, 1889, when the Territory was admitted as a State into the Union.

Death
He died in Tacoma, Washington, on January 29, 1894.
He was interred in Tacoma Cemetery.

References

External links

1842 births
1894 deaths
People of Indiana in the American Civil War
People from La Porte, Indiana
Members of the Indiana House of Representatives
Union Army officers
Washington (state) Republicans
19th-century American politicians
Republican Party members of the United States House of Representatives from Indiana